Danilo Gomes Magalhães (born 5 February 1999), known as Danilo Gomes or simply Danilo, is a Brazilian footballer who plays as an attacking midfielder for J1 League club Albirex Niigata.

Career
On 14 January 2023, Danilo Gomes announcement officially signing transfer to J1 promotion club, Albirex Niigata for ahead of 2023 season.

Career statistics

Club
.

Honours
Atlético Goianiense
 Campeonato Goiano: 2020

References

External links
Futebol de Goyaz profile 

1999 births
Living people
Sportspeople from Tocantins
Brazilian footballers
Association football midfielders
Brazilian expatriate sportspeople in Japan
Campeonato Brasileiro Série A players
Campeonato Brasileiro Série B players
J1 League players
São Paulo FC players
Grêmio Esportivo Brasil players
Atlético Clube Goianiense players
Cuiabá Esporte Clube players
Associação Atlética Ponte Preta players
Albirex Niigata players